The Henry Store Foeste Building (also known as Sheboygan Public Library) is a two-story, classical revival style commercial building located at 522 South Eighth Street in Sheboygan, Wisconsin. It was designed by prominent Wisconsin-based architect William C. Weeks and was constructed between 1892 and 1893. It was the first building to contain the Mead Public Library. It was listed on the National Register of Historic Places on September 1, 1995, one reason being that the original exterior of the building has survived intact for over 100 years.

References

Commercial buildings completed in 1893
Buildings and structures in Sheboygan, Wisconsin
Neoclassical architecture in Wisconsin
Commercial buildings on the National Register of Historic Places in Wisconsin
Libraries in Wisconsin
National Register of Historic Places in Sheboygan County, Wisconsin